The Adolph Block is a historic commercial building located in downtown Salem, Oregon, United States. It was constructed in 1880 by German immigrant and pioneering Salem brewer Samuel Adolph (1835-1893), who purchased the property that Summer after a fire had destroyed the previous wooden buildings on the site. It was designed and built by Salem contractor J.S. Coulter. Completed by the end of the year, It was built sharing party walls with the adjoining J. K. Gill Building (1868) to the West and the long-since demolished Gray's Block on the East, of which one cast iron column remains. Though altered many times over the past century, the Adolph Block still retains many distinctive Italianate details and is one of the finer remaining examples of the style in Salem's downtown historic district.

The building was listed on the National Register of Historic Places in 1980.

See also
 National Register of Historic Places listings in Marion County, Oregon

References

External links

1880 establishments in Oregon
Commercial buildings completed in 1880
Italianate architecture in Oregon
National Register of Historic Places in Salem, Oregon
Individually listed contributing properties to historic districts on the National Register in Oregon
1880s architecture in the United States